Edmore is a city in Ramsey County, North Dakota, United States. The population was 139 at the 2020 census. Edmore was founded in 1901.

Geography
Edmore is located at  (48.411584, -98.455154).

Demographics

2010 census
As of the census of 2010, there were 182 people, 93 households, and 49 families residing in the city. The racial makeup of the city was 96.7% White, 1.6% Native American, and 1.6% Pacific Islander. Hispanic or Latino of any race were 0.5% of the population.

There were 93 households, of which 10.8% had children under the age of 18 living with them, 43.0% were married couples living together, 5.4% had a female householder with no husband present, 4.3% had a male householder with no wife present, and 47.3% were non-families. 46.2% of all households were made up of individuals, and 21.5% had someone living alone who was 65 years of age or older. The average household size was 1.82 and the average family size was 2.49.

The median age in the city was 59.3 years. 9.9% of residents were under the age of 18; 4.8% were between the ages of 18 and 24; 15.3% were from 25 to 44; 32.3% were from 45 to 64; and 37.4% were 65 years of age or older. The gender makeup of the city was 50.0% male and 50.0% female.

2000 census
As of the census of 2000, there were 256 people, 112 households, and 64 families residing in the city. The population density was 931.4 people per square mile (366.1/km2). There were 143 housing units at an average density of 520.3 per square mile (204.5/km2). The racial makeup of the city was 98.05% White, 0.78% Native American, and 1.17% from two or more races. Hispanic or Latino of any race were 0.78% of the population.

There were 112 households, out of which 21.4% had children under the age of 18 living with them, 51.8% were married couples living together, 4.5% had a female householder with no husband present, and 42.0% were non-families. 41.1% of all households were made up of individuals, and 26.8% had someone living alone who was 65 years of age or older. The average household size was 1.94 and the average family size was 2.58.

In the city, the population was spread out, with 14.5% under the age of 18, 1.2% from 18 to 24, 14.8% from 25 to 44, 25.8% from 45 to 64, and 43.8% who were 65 years of age or older. The median age was 60 years. For every 100 females, there were 92.5 males. For every 100 females age 18 and over, there were 95.5 males.

The median income for a household in the city was $26,250, and the median income for a family was $29,659. Males had a median income of $21,250 versus $17,750 for females. The per capita income for the city was $16,857. About 3.6% of families and 7.3% of the population were below the poverty line, including none of those under the age of eighteen and 10.3% of those 65 or over.

Climate
This climatic region is typified by large seasonal temperature differences, with warm to hot (and often humid) summers and cold (sometimes severely cold) winters.  According to the Köppen Climate Classification system, Edmore has a humid continental climate, abbreviated "Dfb" on climate maps.

References

Cities in North Dakota
Cities in Ramsey County, North Dakota
Populated places established in 1901
1901 establishments in North Dakota